Magh is the tenth month in the Bengali calendar. This is the last month of the two months of winter season.

Etymology

This month is named after the star Magha ( Môgha).

Festivals
 Maghi Purnima, a Buddhist festival on the full moon night of this month
 Suryavrata, a vrata observed by Hindu women usually who are unmarried, on the first day of this month
 Saraswati puja, Hindu festival in honor of goddess Saraswati observed on the fifth lunar day in this month, popular in Bangladesh, and Assam and West Bengal states of India.

Observances 
 Suryavrata - Magh 1
 Republic Day of India  and Australia Day - Magh 12 (India), Magh 11 (Bangladesh)
 Super Bowl Sunday - Fourth Sunday of Magh

References

Months of the Bengali calendar